Neferkamin may have been an Eighth Dynasty pharaoh of ancient Egypt during the First Intermediate Period.

His throne name "Sneferka" is attested on the Abydos King List (n. 47) although it is possible that here the name is mistyped, and the O34 hieroglyph ("s") in fact is a R22 ("min"), hence "Neferkamin". The correct reading of this king's name is provided, along with the name of Nikare, on a gold plaque now in the British Museum; however, it has been suggested  that this object could be a forgery.

References

External links
VIIth Dynasty 2175 - 2165, Accessed November 9, 2006.
Abydos King List, Accessed November 9, 2006.

22nd-century BC Pharaohs
Pharaohs of the Eighth Dynasty of Egypt